Eucrosia aurantiaca is a species of plant which is endemic to Ecuador.  Its natural habitats are subtropical or tropical dry forests and subtropical or tropical dry shrubland. It is threatened by habitat loss.

It grows from bulbs 10 cm long and 7–8 cm in diameter. There are usually two stalked (petiolate) leaves, blue-green in colour, with a blade (lamina) which is 40 cm long and 20–25 cm wide. The leaves do not appear until after flowering. The flowers are umbellate, on a stalk (scape) up to 1m in length, yellow, with stamens with prominent long filaments.

In cultivation, plants should be kept warm and dry when the leaves wither, and watered only when the flowers or leaves begin to grow again, when a sunny position is required.

References

External links
 Image of E. aurantiaca at ARKive - Eucrosia aurantiaca

aurantiaca
Endemic flora of Ecuador
Endangered plants
Taxonomy articles created by Polbot
Taxa named by John Gilbert Baker
Taxa named by Ferdinand Albin Pax